The Tour de Santa Catarina (also Volta Ciclística Internacional de Santa Catarina – Portuguese for International Cycling Tour of Santa Catarina) is a multi-stage road bicycle racing event held in the state of Santa Catarina, in the south of Brazil. The first edition was held in 1987. The competition is famous for the traditional mountain stage at Serra do Rio do Rastro, which is one of Brazil's toughest climbs with an average gradient of 10% over an extent of 7 km. The competition is part of the UCI America Tour.

The 21st edition of the race occurred from 15 to 25 November 2007, and featured 11 stages.

The 2008 edition has been postponed due to a flood in the region the race take place. 
A shortened event occurred from 22 to 26 April 2009, replacing the missed edition in the 2008-2009 UCI America Tour. This edition featured only 5 stages over 486 km. A regular edition is expected to take place still in 2009, after September, as part of the 2009–2010 UCI America Tour.

Past winners

Source:

References

External links
 Champions of the Tour of Santa Catarina
 2008 Tour of Santa Catarina postponed

Cycle races in Brazil
Recurring sporting events established in 1987
UCI America Tour races
1987 establishments in Brazil
Sport in Santa Catarina (state)
Defunct cycling races in Brazil